Vilnius City Opera - started in 2006 when a team of independent artists joined forces in staging Giacomo Puccini's La bohème. The artists included: director Dalia Ibelhauptaitė, conductor Gintaras Rinkevičius and scene artist Juozas Statkevičius.

The artists have called themselves bohemiečiai (the Bohemians) since this time. After 8 years of activity, the troupe acquired the status of a professional theatre and became known as the Vilnius City Opera.

Vilnius City Opera has no theatre of their own and stage their operas in the Vilnius Congress Concert Hall. One of the main aims of VCO is to make the opera genre more widely available and to free it from elitist stereotypes and snobbishness.

Operas staged by Vilnius City Opera (selected list):
 Giacomo Puccini La bohème, 2006
 Wolfgang Amadeus Mozart Die Zauberflöte 2007
 Ruggero Leoncavallo Pagliacci, 2008
 Jules Massenet Werther, 2008
 Electronic opera XYZ, 2010 
 Giacomo Puccini Manon Lescaut, 2012
 Marijus Adomaitis, Electronic opera e-Carmen, 2016
 Charles Gounod  Faust, 2017

Opera soloists 

 Asmik Grigorian
 Laimonas Pautienius
 Jurgita Adamonytė
 Jovita Vaškevičiūtė
 Rafailas Karpis
 Tadas Girininkas
 Arūnas Malikėnas
 Edgaras Montvydas
 Justina Gringytė

See also 

Lithuanian opera

References

External links
 
 Lithuanian Opera Companies in Operabase

Opera houses in Lithuania
Theatres in Vilnius